Europe-Asia Studies is an academic peer-reviewed journal published 10 times a year by Routledge on behalf of the Institute of Central and East European Studies, University of Glasgow, and continuing (since vol. 45, 1993) the journal Soviet Studies (vols. 1-44, 1949–1992), which was renamed after the dissolution of the Soviet Union. The journal focuses on political, economic and social affairs of the countries of the former Soviet bloc and their successors, as well as their history in the 20th century. Both Europe-Asia Studies and Soviet Studies are available online with subscription via JSTOR from 1949 onwards.

According to the Journal Citation Reports, the journal has a 2020 impact factor of 2.102, ranking it --- out of 161 journals in the category "Political Science".

References

External links
Europe-Asia Studies @ JSTOR
Soviet Studies @ JSTOR

See also
 Central Asian Survey
 Problems of Post-Communism

Area studies journals
Political science journals
Publications established in 1949
Academic journals associated with universities and colleges